Lake Dombay is a man-made lake of Hungary.

References

Dombay